is a feminine Japanese given name.

Possible writings
Kiyoko can be written many ways using different kanji characters. Some versions of the name are:
 , meaning "pure child"
 , meaning "rejoice-child"
 , meaning "rejoice, gift child"
 , meaning "rejoice, ocean child" 
 , meaning "undefiled child", "virtuous child".

People
 Hayley Kiyoko (: born Hayley Kiyoko Alcroft), an American actress, singer-songwriter, musician, and dancer
 Kiyoko Arai, a manga artist
 Kiyoko Fukuda (born 1944), former First Lady of Japan, wife of Yasuo Fukuda
 Kiyoko Fukuda (born 1970), Japanese former volleyball player
 Kiyoko Murata (born 1945), Japanese writer
, Japanese sprinter
, Japanese judge
 Kiyoko Ono (born 1936), a Japanese politician and former Olympic artistic gymnast
 Kiyoko Sayama, a Japanese anime director
 Kiyoko Shimahara (born 1976), a Japanese marathon runner
 Kiyoko Matsumoto, a person known for having committed suicide by jumping into the crater of Mount Mihara in 1933 which started a trend all over Japan

Fictional characters named Kiyoko
 Kiyoko (aka Number 25), a character in the Japanese Manga, Akira
 Kiyoko Yamaguchi, kayfabe wife of WWE manager Wally Yamaguchi
 Kiyoko (aka Komori /bat/), a character in the Japanese horror film Suicide Club
 Kiyoko Madoka, a character from the manga series Gilgamesh and its anime adaption
 Kiyoko, a character in the Japanese anime film Tokyo Godfathers
 Kiyoko Shimizu, a character in the Japanese anime Haikyuu!!

Japanese feminine given names